, subtitled Time Goes Around, is the 21st studio album by Japanese singer-songwriter Miyuki Nakajima, released in October 1993. Like some previous materials such as Okaerinasai and Change (Oiro Naoshi), the album mainly consists of songs which she wrote for other singers.

Track listing
All songs written by Miyuki Nakajima (except where noted).
 "Jidai (Time Goes Around)" – 5:35
 New recording of a 1975 hit single
""　 – 5:31
 Originally written for Yuri Nakae
"" – 5:00
 New recording of a song originally appeared on her 1988 eponymous album
"" – 4:47
 Originally written for Hideko Yoshida
"" – 4:00
 Originally written for Izumi Yukimura
"" – 8:00
 New recording of an obscure composition initially released in 1972
"" – 6:13
 New recording of a song appeared on her second studio album released in 1976
"" (Nakajima/Juro Kara) – 4:48
 New recording of a theme song for the same titled TV-drama aired in 1987
"" (Tsugutoshi Gotō/Nakajima) – 5:42
 Originally written for Shizuka Kudo
"" – 6:40
 New recording of an unreleased material in the mid 1980s
"" – 6:42
 Originally written for Patricia Kaas

Personnel
 Shigeru Suzuki – electric guitar
 Tsuyoshi Kon – electric guitar
 Masaki Matsubara – acoustic guitar
 Toshiaki Usui – acoustic & dobro guitar
 Chuei Yoshikawa – banjo
 Hideki Wachi – mandolin, bouzouki and balalaika
 Tim Pierce – electric and acoustic Guitar
 Kenji Takamizu – bass guitar
 Yasuo Tomikura – bass guitar
 Bob Graub – bass guitar
 Elton Nagata – keyboards
 Bill Payne – piano
 John Van Tongren – keyboards, computer programming, B-3 Hammond
 Yasuharu Nakanishi – B-3 hammond
 Koichi Matsuda – harmonica
 Nobuo Kurata – keyboards, piano
 Motoya Hamaguchi – percussion, tambourine, congas, Bells
 Eiji Shimamura – drums, cymbals
 Hideo Yamaki – Drums
 Denny Fongheiser – Drums
 Toshihiko Furumura – alto and tenor sax
 Joe Sublett – Tenor Sax
 David Campbell – strings conductor
 Joel Derouin – strings concertmaster
 Suzie Katayama – string contractor
 Takashi Katoh, Joe Osawa – violin
 Yu Watanabe – viola
 Hiroto Kawamura – cello
 Julia Waters – backup vocals
 Maxine Waters – backup vocals
 Oren Waters – backup vocals
 EVE – backup vocals
 Yoshimi Hamada – backup vocals
 Jiroh Toi – backup vocals
 Tatsuhiko Mori – programming
 Nobuhiko Nakayama – programming
 Keishi Urata – programming
 Ichizo Seo – programming, backup vocals

Production
 Producer and Arranger: Ichizo Seo
 Composer, Writer, Producer and Performer: Miyuki Nakajima
 Arranger:Nobuo Kurata, David Campbell
 Engineer and Mixer: Tad Gotoh,  Joe Chiccarelli
 Engineer:Marc DeSisto, Kengo Katoh
 Mixer: Hiroshi Tokunaga, Tomotaka Takehara, Mike Baumagerther
 A&R: Yuzo Watanabe, Kohichi Suzuki
 Assistant: Takao Kido, Tomoko Yamashita, Masahiko Satoh, Aaron Conner, Bill Smith Mike, Junichi Hohrin
 Assistant for Producer: Tsuyoshi Itoh
 Artist Promotor: Yoshio Kan
 Disc Promotor: Shoko Aoki
 Music Coordinator – Takashi Kimura, Fumio Miyata, Tomoko Takaya, Ruriko Duer
 Photographer and Art Director: Jin Tamura
 Designer: Hirofumi Arai
 Costume: Kazumi Yamase
 Hair and Make-up: Noriko Izumisawa
 Artist Management: Kohji Suzuki
 Assistant: Maki Nishida
 Management Desk: Atsuko Hayashi
 General Management: Takahiro Uno
 Special Thanks to Kyu Sakamoto, Judy Ongg, Bunkamura

Chart positions

Miyuki Nakajima albums
1993 albums
Pony Canyon albums
Self-covers albums